Mackenzie Soldan (born May 14, 1992) is an American wheelchair basketball and wheelchair tennis player. She represented the United States at the 2011 Parapan American Games where she won two gold medals, 2012 London Paralympics in wheelchair tennis and 2016 Rio Paralympics in wheelchair basketball. She has played for the U.S. women's wheelchair basketball team since 2013.

Early life
Soldan was born in Saginaw, Michigan. She lost the use of her legs because of a spinal cord tumor at age 2. At age 18 she graduated from Christian Academy of Louisville. When she was in high school, she was a top-ranked player in the Junior wheelchair tennis team. She was also the Women's division' number one player as well. In 2010, due to her passion for basketball she was signed to the University of Alabama's wheelchair basketball team, where she earned another national number one rank.

Career
In late October 2011, she got a phone call saying that she might be qualified for the Parapan American Games. Soldan decided to go, and brought home 2 gold medals for singles and doubles. Besides winning those medals she also carried an American flag which was given by her coach.

Personal life
Soldan currently resides in Tuscaloosa, Alabama. Besides sports, she plays the guitar and piano as a hobby. In 2007, she participated at the U.S. Under 19 Wheelchair Basketball Team and in 2011 won a gold medal in the U.S. Under 25 Team. The same year, Mackenzie was a member of Collegiate National Wheelchair Basketball Championship and represented University of Alabama there. In 2016, she graduated with a master's degree in marketing.

References

External links
 
 
 
 

1992 births
Living people
American female tennis players
Wheelchair tennis players
American women's wheelchair basketball players
Paralympic wheelchair tennis players of the United States
Wheelchair tennis players at the 2012 Summer Paralympics
People with paraplegia
Sportspeople from Saginaw, Michigan
Basketball players from Louisville, Kentucky
Sportspeople from Louisville, Kentucky
21st-century American women
Tennis people from Michigan
20th-century American women